Khimo Gumatay (born September 24, 2000), better known as Khimo, is a Filipino singer-songwriter from Makati City, Philippines and the winner of the second season of Idol Philippines.

Early life
Gumatay, the second of three kids, was born and raised to a clan of performers; his father was a member of the famous "The Singing Cooks and Waiters" and a sister who also sings but settled into the military. On his teenage years, Gumatay was advised by his family to enter the police or the military service, but his love and passion for singing prevailed which resulted to music trainings, joining competitions, and singing commercial jingles. In College, he became a member of the UMak Chorale that helped him to get the scholarship, eventually finished his studies. In a media conference, Gumatay shared that during the pandemic he became a live streamer to generate funds that leads him to be a part of an international singing competition held on Instagram organized by Boyz II Men member Wanya Morris.

Career

2019–2021: Career Beginnings 

In 2019, Gumatay contended in the fourth quarter of the third season of Tawag ng Tanghalan with his version of Jason Derulo's hit Marry Me. That same year, he also participated on Your Moment as part of the duo called "Binary". In 2021, Gumatay released his debut single "Where the Sun Goes" featuring singer-songwriter and composer Dotty.

2022: Idol Philippines Season 2 

In July 2022, his audition piece Isn't She Lovely by Stevie Wonder garnered praises from the judges; with Regine Velasquez saying "the hopeful knows how to play his cards well, how to hit the high notes and charm his audience". In August 2022, his performance of Brian Mcknight's One Last Cry received an approval from Boyz II Men member Wanya Morris. On September 18, he was announced as the grand winner of Idol Philippines after garnering 89 percent of combined judges scores and public votes with his journey song "Bagong Simula" and winning piece "My Time", earning a ₱1 million cash prize, a franchise from Dermacare worth ₱3 million, a house and lot worth ₱2.5 million from Camella Homes, and a contract with Star Music.

2022-present: Post Idol Philippines Season 2 

The day after winning the Idol Philippines, Khimo appeared on the morning show TeleRadyo. On September 23, Khimo performed "My Time" on It's Showtime. On September 25, Khimo together with Ryssi Avila, Kice, Ann Raniel, and Bryan Chong officially launched as a new addition on the Philippines' Sunday variety show ASAP Natin 'To, where he performed "My Time". On September 28, Khimo made an appearance on the morning show Frontline sa Umaga.

Discography

Singles

Collaborations

Concerts and tours

Joint tours and concerts

Performances on award shows and specials

Filmography

Television

See also
List of Idols winners
2022 in Philippine music

Notes

References

External links
 

2000 births
Living people
Filipino singer-songwriters
21st-century Filipino male singers
ABS-CBN personalities
Star Music artists
Participants in Philippine reality television series
Tawag ng Tanghalan contestants
English-language singers from the Philippines
2019 establishments in the Philippines
People from Makati